Karotseris  is a Greek folkloric Hasaposerviko tune.

Original form

The original form of the Hasaposerviko was popular in Constantinople by the Greeks.

See also

Hasapiko
Syrtos
Music of Greece

References

Greek music
Turkish music
Turkish songs
Greek songs
Domna Samiou songs
Glykeria songs
Songwriter unknown
Year of song unknown